Mochovce is a former village in western Slovakia, best known for its nuclear power plant.

The village inhabitants were relocated and the village was destroyed to make place for the power plant. A late baroque church and a cemetery are the only remaining structures. In contrast, the power plant construction has brought an economic and demographic boom to the nearby town of Levice in the 1980s.

External links
 Official website of the power plant

Former villages in Slovakia